Tom Clancy's Rainbow Six: Lockdown is a 2005 tactical first-person shooter video game. It is the fourth game in the Rainbow Six series. The initial design and PlayStation 2 version were developed by Red Storm Entertainment and the Xbox version was developed by Ubisoft Montreal. Both are published by Ubisoft. The game's plot follows Rainbow, an international counterterrorist organization, as they battle a terrorist organization that has stolen a deadly bioweapon.

The mobile phone version was released on June 9, 2005; the PlayStation 2 and Xbox versions were released on September 6; the GameCube version was released on September 27; and the Windows version was released on February 16, 2006.

Gameplay
The player controls the main character, Rainbow team commander Domingo "Ding" Chavez, and leads a single squad in real-time through each level. The player can issue orders to team members, such as to breach a door or toss a grenade into a room. Missions are broken up into linear levels, instead of each mission taking place on a single non-linear map. Lockdown also gives players the ability to save their in-game progress at any time during a level, in contrast to some previous games' lack of an in-game save feature.

Console versions
The console versions of Lockdown features several "shooting gallery"-style sniper missions, in which players take control of Rainbow sniper Dieter Weber, and snipe terrorists from a position such as a small room or a helicopter while covering the entry of an AI-controlled squad into an area. The console versions also feature cut scenes that flesh out the personality and background of each Rainbow member, as well as collectible suitcases hidden throughout each level that can be collected for bonus material.

PC version
The PC version of Lockdown removed the sniper segments and storyline-related cut scenes, and also included redesigned levels to match the less linear gameplay of previous entries in the series. Several other longstanding elements of the series that were removed from the console versions were added back into the PC version, including helmets on the character models. Lockdown is the first game in the series to remove the planning phase.

Story
In 2009, Rainbow, a secret international counterterrorist organization led by John Clark, deploys their Alpha team, commanded by Domingo Chavez, to rescue the South African President from a rebel army surrounding Pretoria. Elsewhere in the city, the Global Liberation Front, an anti-Western left-wing terrorist organization led by Bastian Vanderwaal, steals "Legion", a nanite aerosol bioweapon that causes massive hemorrhaging and has a 100% fatality rate.

Later, the GLF attacks the Scottish Parliament Building, and Alpha saves the hostages and captures some of the terrorists. The captured terrorists reveal a GLF cell's training facility under a distillery in Olivet, which Alpha raids to capture cell leader Derek Mergen; however, Mergen is shot by his own men in an attempt to silence him, but he survives and is hospitalized. After Alpha defends the hospital from a GLF onslaught, Mergen tells Clark the GLF is planning something, though he does not explain what.

Raiding another GLF facility in Paris, Rainbow learns a GLF cell will conduct an arms deal for the plan at the Port of Calais. Rainbow and the GIGN ambush the deal, but the GLF, expecting their presence, hijacks a ferry and rigs it with explosives to deter pursuit; Alpha, assisted by Rainbow sniper Dieter Weber, is able to board the ferry and defeat them without incident. GLF informant Nicolai Yazhov, a KGB rival from Chavez's CIA career, offers to meet with Rainbow in Marseille, but the meeting is an ambush and Yazhov flees. Chavez pursues and captures Yazhov, and Alpha saves him from GLF hitmen; Yazhov claims he was forced to organize the ambush, and points Rainbow to Algerian arms dealer Faisal Amidan.

Alpha infiltrates Amidan's heavily-guarded compound in Algeria, where they identify Vanderwaal. However, while exfiltrating, Weber is captured by the GLF. NATO declares him an acceptable loss, but Chavez defies orders and rescues Weber from captivity. Investigating Vanderwaal's Gibraltar estate, Rainbow learns the GLF's plan is to attack the NATO Summit in Barcelona and infect the world leaders present with Legion in a live broadcast. The GLF launches the attack later that day, but Alpha is able to defeat the terrorists and rescue the NATO leaders.

Rainbow tracks Vanderwaal to an old castle on Menorca, but Vanderwaal is nowhere to be found. Interrogations reveal Vanderwaal is attempting to leave Menorca, planning to poison a major European city's water supply with Legion. Alpha intercepts them, defeating the remnants of the GLF and killing Vanderwaal, ending the GLF's threat.

The plot of the PC version is essentially the same as the console version, the only differences being less missions, a slightly different chronology (such as Amidan being identified earlier), and the antagonists being multiple terrorist groups with the GLF acting as their organizer and Legion distributor.

Multiplayer
The Xbox version of Lockdown features an exclusive gameplay mode for Microsoft's Xbox Live service called "Persistent Elite Creation" (PEC).  This mode allows the player to have a persistent character while playing in online multiplayer games, who can gain levels. There are four "careers" to choose from: Commando, Medic, Engineer, and Spec-Op. Each class features different abilities and strengths: Commandos are able to use heavy weaponry and armor, Medics can use items to heal teammates during battle, Engineers can set up gun turrets, and Spec-Ops are stealthy and use surveillance equipment. As incentive to continue leveling up, bonuses can be unlocked by achieving certain goals, such as new weapons and items. Light role-playing video game-like elements exist, such as stat points that can be distributed across various skills.

The PlayStation 2 version, while lacking the Xbox version's PEC mode, has its own online mode. Called "Rivalry", this mode pits teams of terrorists against teams of counterterrorist operatives.

The Nintendo GameCube version of the game does not take advantage of the system's optional broadband or modem adapters, meaning there is no online mode. However, the GCN version includes an exclusive two-player co-op mode.

Reception

The change in gameplay from previous versions of Rainbow Six was considered a controversial move, and the PC version received significantly lower scores than its predecessors. Despite this, the console versions of the game have received average reviews from many gaming websites and magazines.

References

External links
Official website

2005 video games
Cooperative video games
First-person shooters
GameCube games
Mobile games
Multiplayer and single-player video games
Multiplayer online games
PlayStation 2 games
Red Storm Entertainment games
Tactical shooter video games
Tom Clancy games
 04
Ubisoft games
Video games developed in the United States
Video games set in South Africa
Video games using Havok
Windows games
Xbox games